Yugan may refer to:
Yugan County, in Shangrao, Jiangxi, China
Yugan dialect, dialect of the Gan language. It is spoken in Yugan County, Jiangxi
Yugan (settlement), a settlement in the Republic of Tatarstan, Russia
10016 Yugan, an asteroid discovered by Lyudmila Zhuravlyova